The 2018 West Oxfordshire District Council election was held on 3 May 2018 to elect members of West Oxfordshire District Council in England. This was on the same day as other local elections.

Elections were held for 17 of the 49 seats on the council. Five seats changed hands. The Conservative Party lost five seats, the Liberal Democrats gained three and the Labour Party gained two. The Conservatives remained in overall control of the council with a reduced total of 34 seats. The Liberal Democrats remained the largest opposition group with eight seats. The Labour Party remained the third largest party with six seats.

Ward results

Ascott and Shipton

Bampton and Clanfield

Brize Norton and Shilton

Burford

Carterton North East

Carterton North West

Carterton South

Chipping Norton

Ducklington

Eynsham and Cassington

Freeland and Hanborough

The Bartons

Witney East

Witney South

Woodstock and Bladon

References

2010s in Oxfordshire
2018 English local elections
2018